Lucy Takiora Lord (9 October 1842 – 3 September 1893) was a New Zealand guide and interpreter.

Biography
She was born in Russell, Northland, New Zealand. She was the daughter of the Māori Kotiro Hinerangi and the English shop owner William Lord. Lord, alongside her first husband, Te Mahuki, were known as guides and interpreters for Gustavus von Tempsky and British troops during the New Zealand Wars in the 1860s. Later, she acted as an interpreter during land purchases of Māori land.

She married Joseph Dalton in 1878.

Death and legacy
She died on 3 September 1893 at New Plymouth hospital.

In July 2021 a play called Kūpapa based on the life of Lucy Takiora Lord written by her descendant Nicola Kawana premiered. The play was presented by Te Pou Theatre in Auckland and directed by Erina Daniels.

References

External links
 Photograph of Lucy Lord, Puke Ariki

1842 births
1893 deaths
Interpreters
People from Russell, New Zealand
19th-century translators
19th-century New Zealand people